Xylota bicincta is a species of hoverfly in the family Syrphidae.

Distribution
Unknown.

References

Eristalinae
Insects described in 1940
Taxa named by Zoltán Szilády
Diptera of Asia